Angel Express is a German film made in 1998, written and directed by Rolf Peter Kahl.

Cast
Dave Allert as Jan C.
Sanna Englund
Arno Frisch as Doctor
Eva Habermann as Svenja
Wilfried Hochholdinger as N. K.
Chris Hohenester as Iris von Than
Doreen Jacobi as Tanja
Rolf Peter Kahl as Patrick
Ulrike Panse as Liv
Niels-Bruno Schmidt
Laura Tonke as Jil

External links

Official site

1998 films
German drama films
1990s German-language films
Films set in Berlin
1990s German films